André Morizet (26 January 1876 – 30 March 1942) was a French politician. He served as a member of the French Senate from 1927 to 1942, representing Seine.

Works

References

1876 births
1942 deaths
Politicians from Reims
French Senators of the Third Republic
French non-fiction writers
Senators of Seine (department)